Agonopterix trimenella is a moth in the family Depressariidae. It was described by Walsingham in 1881. It is found in South Africa.

The wingspan is 11–20 mm. The forewings are pale ochreous, partly suffused with a pale brownish shade, especially on the lower half of the wing 
before the middle, at the extreme end of the cell, and immediately above the anal angle. There is a large blackish patch, starting at the middle of the costa, continued more than half-way to the apex, extending nearly half across the wing, where it ends at its inner angle in a conspicuous black spot, preceded by some detached black scales. Before this patch are three or four blackish spots on the costa, other smaller ones being distributed 
around the apical margin. The hindwings are pale cinereous.

References

Endemic moths of South Africa
Moths described in 1881
Agonopterix
Moths of Africa